James and Mary Lawson House is located in Woodstown, Salem County, New Jersey, United States. The house was built in 1869 and was added to the National Register of Historic Places on February 16, 2001.

See also
National Register of Historic Places listings in Salem County, New Jersey

References

Houses on the National Register of Historic Places in New Jersey
Italianate architecture in New Jersey
Houses completed in 1869
Houses in Salem County, New Jersey
National Register of Historic Places in Salem County, New Jersey
1869 establishments in New Jersey
New Jersey Register of Historic Places
Woodstown, New Jersey